Global Indian Film Awards (GIFA) was an awards ceremony held between 2005 and 2007, conceptualized to acknowledge excellence in the Hindi film industry and honour artists in 28 categories across various genres, from acting to film making. It is held in a different country each year, 2005 in Dubai, Kuala Lumpur in 2006.

Jury 
The jury members for the first awards were Aziz Mirza, Om Puri, Firoz Nadiadwala, Kabir Bedi, Bharti Pradhan, Umesh Mehra and Priti Hiranandani. The ceremony was organised at Dubai's Al-Wasi Stadium from 25 to 27 January 2005.

The ceremony produced by Global Events, Dubai and is backed by Suniel Shetty, Chairman of Popcorn Entertainment. The jury members are: Jackie Shroff, Rati Agnihotri, Sajid Nadiadwala, Sandeep Chowta, Shyam Benegal, and Smita Thackeray.

Awards

References 

Bollywood film awards
Awards established in 2005